Yassıhüyük can refer to:

 Yassıhüyük, Acıpayam
 Yassıhüyük, Çivril
 Yassıhüyük, Polatlı